Lovisa Berndtsson (born 9 December 1988) is a Swedish ice hockey goaltender, currently playing in the Premier Hockey Federation (PHF) with the Buffalo Beauts. As a member of the Swedish national team, she participated in the 2017 IIHF Women's World Championship. She previously played with Djurgårdens IF Hockey Dam, SDE HF, and AIK Hockey Dam in the Swedish Women's Hockey League (SDHL; called Riksserien until 2016).

Career 

Berndtsson began her Riksserien career with Segeltorps IF, playing one game with the club during the 2008–09 season. She then played several seasons with Södertälje SK in the Division 1 (rebranded as Damettan in 2015) before signing with AIK IF and returning to the Riksserien for the 2013–14 season. She played the 2014–15 season with SDE HF before signing with Djurgårdens IF Hockey for the 2015–16 season. In her second season with Djurgården, she backstopped the team to the SDHL Championship, finishing with the third best save percentage in the league – recording an excellent .940 SV% across 27 games in the regular season – and earning shutouts in each playoff round. 

She was selected by the Buffalo Beauts in the 2021 NWHL International Draft on 25 July 2021. She was signed by the Beauts to a professional contract the following day, becoming the first player from the NWHL International Draft to sign a contract in the league.

International 
She participated at the 2017 IIHF Women's World Championship.

References

External links

1988 births
Living people
AIK Hockey Dam players
Buffalo Beauts players
Djurgårdens IF Hockey Dam players
Ice hockey people from Stockholm
SDE Hockey players
Swedish expatriate ice hockey players in the United States
Swedish women's ice hockey goaltenders